Farouq Farkhan (born 6 June 1988) is a footballer who plays for Woodlands Wellington in the S.League.

He usually plays as a winger or wing back.

Club career

Prior to joining the Rams, Farkhan was a member of Gombak United's Prime League team before signing an Sleague contract for the senior team in 2012.

On 31 January 2013, Woodlands Wellington announced that Farkhan has been confirmed after impressing the coaching panel as a trialist during Woodlands Wellington's round of pre-season friendlies.

Farkhan made his debut for the Rams against Tampines Rovers on 27 April 2013, where he scored a goal to mark his debut.

He then represent for Tiong Bahru Football Club (2015-2018) in Singapore NFL Div 1 and amateur league side Athletico CF.

Farouq Signs for Admiralty FC before he left for Yishun Sentek Mariners of the NFL Div 1 in june 2019.

He Currently Holds the no. 9 Jersey at Yishun Sentek Mariners.

Club career statistics

All numbers encased in brackets signify substitute appearances.

References

Singaporean footballers
Living people
1988 births
Woodlands Wellington FC players
Gombak United FC players
Association football midfielders
Singapore Premier League players